Jamie Reed Kovac is an American actress, body builder and civil engineer.  She is best known for playing Fury on American Gladiators.
Born Jamie Reed, she holds a B.S. in Civil Engineering and a Masters in Engineering Management from Cornell's College of Engineering, and played varsity softball and competed in pole vault on the varsity track and field team. She has also competed in National Physique Committee Figure events, and in 2007 she placed 4th at the NPC National Figure Championships in New York and 3rd at the NPC USA Figure Championships in Las Vegas. In 2010, she won the title America's Strongest Middleweight Woman. She is married to former Cornell Big Red hockey player Frank Kovac.

References

External links

Jamie Reed's Official Homepage

1977 births
Living people
American female bodybuilders
American civil engineers
Cornell University College of Engineering alumni
American television actresses
Cornell Big Red softball players